Amar Muralidharan is an Indian swimmer who has earned 6 National Titles. He held the 200 M Butterfly & Freestyle National Titles from 2000-2004.
He has won a silver medal at the first Afro Asian Games held at Hyderabad India in 2003  and 3 gold medals at South Asian Games held at Islamabad Pakistan. He has also won several gold medals at World Police & Fire Games and won a bronze medal at 2006 Canada Cup in 4x200 meters freestyle relay swimming for University Laval. Amar represented India in the 2007 FINA World Swimming Championships held at Melbourne Australia. He swam the 200 M Freestyle and was part of 4x100 M Freestyle Relay Squad.

Career Biography
Born in Pune, Maharashtra, India Amar started swimming at the age of 8 coached by his father G Muralidharan a former athlete, Ranji Trophy cricketer and Commander, Indian Navy. At a young age of 13 he had already won a gold medal in the age group nationals in 200 meters freestyle. He won a bronze medal in the 400 meters Freestyle event at the Asian Age Group swimming championships held at Zhuhai, China in 2002. Along with his younger brother Arjun, Amar participated in the national Open water 10 km endurance swim race held at Pune finishing first with a time of 1 hour 4 mins and 54 seconds. He has trained in United Kingdom and Canada from 2006 to 2010 under reputed coaches. He has swum for Rouge et Or swimming team in Quebec in 2006, Stockport Metro Swimming Club in 2007 and Toronto Swim Club from 2008-2010. 
Amar won the 50 Butterfly and 100 Freestyle events at 57th All India Police Championships held at Thiruvananthapuram, Kerala. He has served under Central Reserve Police Force from 1999 up until 2009 as an Inspector under the sports recruitment program.
Won a bronze medal in the line throw event at the 2012 World Life Saving Championships held at Adelaide, Australia

Personal life 

Amar is the Head Coach of Blue Water Swimming Academy at Baner Pune. He also trains in Martial Arts and is 1st Dan black belt in Shotokan Karate.

He is the elder brother and current coach of Arjun Muralidharan.

References

1984 births
Living people
Indian male swimmers
Indian male freestyle swimmers
Indian male butterfly swimmers
Swimmers from Pune
Laval Rouge et Or athletes
South Asian Games gold medalists for India
South Asian Games silver medalists for India
South Asian Games medalists in swimming
20th-century Indian people
21st-century Indian people